Beryozka is a rural locality (a settlement) in Petushinskoye Rural Settlement, Petushinsky District, Vladimir Oblast, Russia. The population was 702 as of 2010.

Geography 
Beryozka is located 11 km north of Petushki (the district's administrative centre) by road. Kibirevo is the nearest rural locality.

References 

Rural localities in Petushinsky District